Nicky Morgan may refer to:

Nicky Morgan (born 1972), British Conservative Party politician and the Member of Parliament for Loughborough
Nicky Morgan (born 1959), footballer who played in The Football League between 1978 and 1994